William Anderson was an American baseball right fielder in the Negro leagues. He played with the Nashville Elite Giants in 1930.

References

External links
 and Seamheads 

Nashville Elite Giants players
Year of birth missing
Year of death missing
Baseball outfielders